West Harbour is a passenger and cargo harbour in the Jätkäsaari district of Helsinki, Finland, in the southwestern part of the Helsinginniemi peninsula. The Länsisatama harbour area also includes the Munkkisaaren laituri pier on the west side of Munkkisaari, used by cruiseliners. The harbour is operated by the Port of Helsinki.

It has two passenger terminals: West Terminal 1 and West Terminal 2, which opened in February 2017. West Terminal 1 is used mainly by passenger ships from Helsinki to Saint Petersburg. West Terminal 2 is specialised in fast scheduled traffic to Tallinn, Estonia. As of 2013, Tallink and Eckerö Line operate routes to Tallinn, and St. Peter Line to Saint Petersburg. 

The construction of a new residential area for 15 thousand inhabitants in Jätkäsaari continues , using land freed up after the container traffic in West Harbour was moved to Vuosaari Harbour in 2008.

Immediately next to West Harbour, in the Munkkisaari quarter, there is the Helsinki shipyard in Hietalahti. However, it is not counted as part of the harbour area of Länsisatama.

Länsisatama is also the 20th neighbourhood of the city, extending around the harbour.

The passenger terminals are served by Helsinki tram lines 7 and 9.

References

External links

 Port of Helsinki: West Terminal 

Buildings and structures in Helsinki
Jätkäsaari
Ports and harbours of Finland
Transport in Helsinki